Nevers (later Nevirnum and Nebirnum) is the prefecture of the Nièvre department in the Bourgogne-Franche-Comté region in central France. It was the principal city of the former province of Nivernais.

History
Nevers first enters written history as Noviodunum, a town held by the Aedui at Roman contact. The quantities of medals and other Roman antiquities found on the site indicate the importance of the place, and in 52 BCE, Julius Caesar made Noviodunum, which he describes as in a convenient position on the banks of the Loire, a depot (B. G. vii. 55). There, he had his hostages, corn and military chest, with the money in it allowed him from home for the war, his own and his army's baggage and a great number of horses which had been bought for him in Spain and Italy.

After his failure before Gergovia, the Aedui at Noviodunum massacred those who were there to look after stores, the negotiators and the travellers who were in the place. They divided the money and the horses among themselves, carried off in boats all the corn that they could and burned the rest or threw it into the river.

Thinking they could not hold the town, they burned it. That was a great loss to Caesar, and it may seem that he was imprudent in leaving such great stores in the power of treacherous allies. However, he was in straits that year, and probably he could not have done other than he did.

Dio Cassius (xl. 38) tells the story of Caesar out of the affair of Noviodunum. He states incorrectly what Caesar did on the occasion, and he shows that he neither understood his original nor knew what he was writing about.

The city was later called Nevirnum, as the name appears in the Antonine Itinerary. In the Tabula Peutingeriana, it is corrupted into Ebrinum. In still other sources the name appears as Nebirnum or Nivernum.

It became the seat of a bishopric at the end of the 5th century. The county dates at least from the beginning of the 10th century. The citizens of Nevers obtained charters in 1194 and 1231. For a short time in the 14th century the town was the seat of a university, transferred from Orléans, to which it was restored.

In 1565, the town became the seat of a branch of the Gonzaga family, who in 1627 succeeded to the Duchy of Mantua. This line of the Gonzaga Dukes of Nevers itself died out in 1708.

Geography

Nevers is situated on the slope of a hill on the right bank of the river Loire.

Climate

Main sights

Narrow winding streets lead from the quay through the town where there are numerous old houses dating from the 14th to the 17th century.

Among the ecclesiastical buildings the most important is the Cathédrale of Saint Cyr-Sainte Julitte, dedicated to Saint Quiricus and Saint Julietta, which is a combination of two buildings, and possesses two apses. The apse and transept at the west end are the remains of a Romanesque church, while the nave and eastern apse are in the Gothic style and belong to the 14th century. There is no transept at the eastern end. The lateral portal on the south side belongs to the late 15th century; the massive and elaborately decorated tower which rises beside it dates to the early 16th century.

The church of Saint Étienne is a specimen of the Romanesque style of Auvergne of which the disposition of the apse with its three radiating chapels is characteristic. It was consecrated at the close of the 9th century, and belonged to a priory affiliated to Cluny.

The Ducal Palace (now occupied by the courts of justice and an important ceramic museum) was built in the 15th and 16th centuries and is one of the principal feudal edifices in central France. The façade is flanked at each end by a turret and a round tower. A middle tower containing the great staircase has its windows adorned by sculptures relating to the history of the House of La Marck by the members of which the greater part of the palace was built.

Behind the palace lies an open space with a fine view over the Loire Valley. The Porte du Croux, a square tower, with corner turrets, dating from the end of the 14th century, is among the remnants of the old fortifications; it now contains a collection of sculptures and Roman antiquities.

A triumphal arch from the 18th century, commemorating the victory of Fontenoy and the hôtel de ville, a 19th century building which contains the library, are of some interest. The Loire is crossed by a modern stone bridge, and by an iron railway bridge.

At the Chapel of Saint Bernadette at the mother house of the Sisters of Charity of Nevers, it is possible to view the incorrupt body of Saint Bernadette Soubirous, the famous seer of Our Lady of Lourdes apparitions, which are presented in a gold and crystal reliquary.

Economy
Nevers is the seat of a bishopric, of tribunals of first instance and of commerce and of a cour d'assises and has a chamber of commerce and a branch of the Bank of France. Its educational institutions include several lycées, a training college for female teachers, ecclesiastical seminaries, a school of art of the automotive engineering college Institut supérieur de l'automobile et des transports. The town manufactures porcelain, agricultural implements, chemical manures, glue, boilers and iron goods, boots and shoes and fur garments, and has distilleries, tanneries and dye works. Its trade is in iron and steel, wood, wine, grain, livestock, etc. hydraulic lime, kaolin and clay for the manufacture of faience are worked in the vicinity.

Transport
Nevers railway station offers connections to Paris, Dijon, Lyon, Clermont-Ferrand and several regional destinations. The A77 motorway connects Nevers with Paris.

Population

Notable people
 Marie Louise Gonzaga, Queen of Poland, born in Nevers in 1611
 Marie Casimire Louise de La Grange d'Arquien, Queen of Poland, born in Nevers in 1641
 Pierre Gaspard Chaumette, revolutionary, born in Nevers in 1763
 Bernadette Soubirous, better known as Saint Bernadette of Lourdes, died in Nevers in 1879 (aged 35).
 Anne Boutiaut, born in Nevers in 1851 and later known as La Mère Poulard in Mont St-Michel
 Michel Vieuchange, Saharan explorer, adventurer and writer, born in Nevers in 1904, where there is a street named after him
 Jean Vieuchange, editor of Michel Vieuchange's travel notebooks, born in Nevers in 1906
 Pierre Bérégovoy, former Prime Minister of France, committed suicide in 1993 in Nevers
 Parfait Mandanda, footballer, born in Nevers in 1989
Valérie Beauvais, politician, born in Nevers in 1963
 Alexandre Oukidja, Algerian professional footballer, born in Nevers in 1988
 Roselyne Bachelot, French politician and former Minister of Culture, born in Nevers in 1946
 Guy Savoy, French chef, born in Nevers in 1953
 Da Silva, singer-songwriter, born in Nevers in 1976

Culture

Nevers has been known for several centuries for its Nevers faience.

The Formula One circuit of Magny-Cours is located near Nevers, as well as the museum Conservatoire de la monoplace française.

The anonymous French woman (played by Emmanuelle Riva) who is the main character in the film Hiroshima mon amour by Alain Resnais is from Nevers, and the film features many flashbacks to her youth there during World War II. In the final scene of the film, her Japanese lover tells her "You are Nevers". There is a lot of play on the English translation of the town's name throughout the film, with dialogue such as "Nevers ?  Jamais !" ("Nevers? Never!")

Most of the scenes in the film Rosalie Blum were filmed in Nevers between March and April 2015, with the exception of the end scenes, which were filmed at Leffrinckoucke in the Nord.

Nevers is also the setting of most of the second half of Éric Rohmer's 1992 film, Conte d'Hiver.

International relations

Nevers is twinned with:

 Koblenz, Germany
 Erzsébetváros (Budapest), Hungary
 Mantua, Italy
 St Albans, England, United Kingdom
 Lund, Sweden
 Stavroupoli, Greece

 Curtea de Argeș, Romania
 Taizhou, China
 Charleville-Mézières, France
 Hammamet, Tunisia
 Neubrandenburg, Germany

See also
 Wine barrels
 Communes of the Nièvre department

References

External links

 Official website
 
 
 Nevers page on the site Bourgogne Romane

 
Communes of Nièvre
Prefectures in France
Aedui
Nivernais
Nièvre communes articles needing translation from French Wikipedia